Wu Shaozu (April 1939 – September 18, 2012) was a Chinese politician and a major general of the People's Liberation Army.

Wu was born in April 1939 in Leiyang, Hunan, China.  After his military service Wu served as Minister of Sports and head of various sporting bodies in China.  He died on September 18, 2012, aged 73.

References

1939 births
2012 deaths
People from Leiyang
Chinese Communist Party politicians from Hunan
People's Liberation Army generals from Hunan
Tsinghua University alumni
Politicians from Hengyang
People's Republic of China politicians from Hunan